"Lay Your Hands on Me" is the first single released from the album Here's to Future Days by the British band Thompson Twins. Written by Tom Bailey, Alannah Currie, and Joe Leeway, it was released in the UK almost a year in advance of the album.

There are two main versions of the song, with various edits and remixes of the two. The first version, produced by Alex Sadkin & Tom Bailey, was released in late 1984 in Europe and Australia.  The 1985 version was a reworking co-produced by Nile Rodgers, adding electric guitar and a gospel choir and released as a single in the US; this version appeared on the album.

The single peaked at No. 13 in the UK, spending nine weeks on the chart. In the US, it peaked at No. 14 on both the Adult Contemporary and Rock Tracks charts, No. 46 on the Dance Club Play chart, and No. 6 on the Hot 100 singles chart.

The B-side, "The Lewis Carol (Adventures in Wonderland)", is an instrumental variation of the song and was exclusive to this single.

Content

Singer Tom Bailey said,

Music video
Two versions of the promotional music video directed by Dee Trattmann exist for the single. The original edit of the music video features the band performing the 1984 version of the song on a stage in front of an audience of pop star look-alikes including David Bowie, Siouxsie Sioux, Mari Wilson, Gary Glitter, Boy George and Grace Jones. When the song was reworked in 1985, the video was re-edited with the 1985 version dubbed instead.

Formats 
7" UK vinyl single (1984) Arista TWINS 6
 "Lay Your Hands on Me" – 4:11
 "The Lewis Carol (Adventures in Wonderland)" – 4:10

12" UK vinyl single (1984) Arista TWINS 126
 "Lay Your Hands on Me" (Extended Mix/Full Version) – 6:08
 "The Lewis Carol (Adventures in Wonderland)" – 4:10

7" UK vinyl single (1984) Arista TWING 6
 "Lay Your Hands on Me" (U.S. Re-mix) – 4:19
 "The Lewis Carol (Adventures in Wonderland)" – 4:10

12" UK vinyl single (1984) Arista TWINS 226
 "Lay Your Hands on Me" (U.S. Re-mix) – 5:51
 "The Lewis Carol (Adventures in Wonderland)" – 4:10

7" UK vinyl Picture Disc (1984) Arista TWISD 6
 "Lay Your Hands on Me" (Single Version) – 3:44
 "The Lewis Carol (Adventures in Wonderland)" – 4:12

 New Zealand cassette single (1984) Festival Records-C 14155
 "Lay Your Hands on Me" (Extended Version) – 6:05
 "Lay Your Hands on Me" (U.S. Remix) – 5:56
 "The Lewis Carol (Adventures in Wonderland)" – 4:13

7" U.S. vinyl single (1985) Arista AS1-9396
 "Lay Your Hands on Me" (Single Version) – 3:44
 "The Lewis Carol (Adventures in Wonderland)" – 4:12

12" U.S. vinyl single (1985) Arista AD1-9397
 "Lay Your Hands on Me" (Single Version) – 3:52
 "The Lewis Carol (Adventures in Wonderland)" – 4:14
 "Lay Your Hands on Me" (Extended Version) – 6:00

7" vinyl (1985 promo) Arista AS1-9396
 "Lay Your Hands on Me" (Cold Ending) – 3:44
 "Lay Your Hands on Me" (Fade) – 3:44

Personnel 
Written by Alannah Currie, Tom Bailey, and Joe Leeway.
 Tom Bailey – vocals, piano, Fairlight, synthesizers, guitar, contrabass, Fairlight and drum programming
 Alannah Currie – lyrics, marimba, backing vocals, acoustic drums, percussion, tuned percussion
 Joe Leeway – backing vocals, congas, percussion

1984 Versions
 Produced by Alex Sadkin and Tom Bailey
 Remixed by Alex Sadkin, Tom Bailey, and John 'Tokes' Potoker (U.S. Re-mix)
 Sleeve Designs – Satori
 Art Direction – Alannah Currie and Nick Marchant
 Photography – Moshe Brakha

1985 Versions
 Produced by Alex Sadkin, Nile Rodgers, and Tom Bailey
 Engineered by James Farber and Terry Becker
 Mixed by James Farber
 Backing Vocals – East Harlem Hobo Choir
 Mixed at Skyline Studio, NYC
 Photography – Rebecca Blake
 Artwork/Design – Andie Airfix, Satori
 Art Direction – Alannah

Chart performance

Official versions

References 

1984 singles
1985 singles
Thompson Twins songs
Songs written by Alannah Currie
Songs written by Tom Bailey (musician)
Songs written by Joe Leeway
1984 songs
Song recordings produced by Nile Rodgers
Arista Records singles
Festival Records singles
Music videos directed by Meiert Avis